Hampton Smith (born c. 1935) is a former American football and baseball coach. He served two stints as the head football coach at Albany State University in Albany, Georgia, from 1971 to 1976 and again from 1982 to 1999, and compiling a record of 157–90–4. Smith was also the head baseball coach at Albany State from 1981 to 1983, tallying a mark of 46–37–1. Before he was hired at Albany State in 1981, Smith coached high school football in McComb and Prentiss, Mississippi. He graduated from Mississippi Vocational College—now known as Mississippi Valley State University—and earned a master's degree from Tennessee State University.

Head coaching record

College football

References

1967 births
Living people
Albany State Golden Rams baseball coaches
Albany State Golden Rams football coaches
Arkansas–Pine Bluff Golden Lions football coaches
Mississippi Valley State Delta Devils football coaches
Mississippi Valley State Delta Devils football players
Tennessee State Tigers football coaches
High school football coaches in Mississippi
People from Greenwood, Mississippi
Players of American football from Mississippi
African-American coaches of American football
African-American players of American football
African-American baseball coaches
20th-century African-American sportspeople
21st-century African-American sportspeople